John Alexander Motyer (30 August 1924 – 26 August 2016), known as J. Alec Motyer, was an Irish biblical scholar. He was Vice-Principal of Clifton Theological College and vicar of St. Luke's, Hampstead, and Christ Church, Westbourne (Bournemouth) (1981–1989), before becoming Principal of Trinity College, Bristol. He spent his later years in Poynton, Cheshire.

Motyer was born in Dublin on 30 August 1924 and educated at The High School, Dublin, before going to Trinity College, Dublin, where he received Bachelor of Arts, Master of Arts, and Bachelor of Divinity degrees. He trained to become an Anglican minister at Wycliffe Hall, Oxford.

Tremper Longman III describes him as a "competent and popular expositor", while Tim Keller has said that Motyer and Edmund Clowney were "the fathers of my preaching ministry". By contrast, Motyer's own opinion of himself was, "I’m not really a scholar. I’m just a man who loves the Word of God.”

He died on 26 August 2016.

Published works

 - reissue of the 1974 title.

 - reissue of The Story of the Old Testament

References

External links

1924 births
2016 deaths
20th-century Church of England clergy
21st-century Church of England clergy
Alumni of Trinity College Dublin
Bible commentators
British biblical scholars
Christian clergy from Dublin (city)
Evangelical Anglican biblical scholars
Evangelical Anglican clergy
People educated at The High School, Dublin
Seminary presidents
Staff of Trinity College, Bristol